The 15th Asianet Film Awards, honoring the best films of 2012, were held on 20 January 2013 at Wellington Island, Kochi. The title sponsor of the event was Ujala.

Film award winners

Special awards

References

A
Asianet Film Awards